Calgary Foothills may refer to:

 Calgary-Foothills (electoral district)
 Calgary Foothills FC, a Canadian men's soccer team
 Calgary Foothills WFC, a Canadian women's soccer team